Newkirk Homestead, also known as the Newkirk-Garcia House, is a historic home located at Leeds in Greene County, New York.  The original structure and basement dates to the 18th century.  It is a five-bay, -story frame dwelling to which is attached a 2-story, three-bay frame addition completed in the mid-19th century.  It features a Greek Revival style portico with four Doric columns, also added in the mid-19th century.  Also on the property are a corn crib, two barns, and a barn foundation.

It was listed on the National Register of Historic Places in 1979.

References

Houses on the National Register of Historic Places in New York (state)
Houses completed in 1849
Houses in Greene County, New York
1849 establishments in New York (state)
National Register of Historic Places in Greene County, New York